The 2019 AFC U-19 Women's Championship qualification is a women's under-19 football competition which decides the participating teams of the 2019 AFC U-19 Women's Championship.

A total of eight teams qualify to play in the final tournament held in Thailand, four of which are decided by qualification.

Teams
Of the 47 AFC member associations, a total of 30 teams entered the competition, with Japan, North Korea, and China PR, automatically qualified for the final tournament by their position as the top three teams of the 2017 AFC U-19 Women's Championship and thus not participating in qualification. The final tournament hosts Thailand, despite having automatically qualified for the final tournament, entered to participate in qualification. As a result, a total of 27 teams entered qualification. Due to the increased number of teams, two qualification rounds were scheduled for the first time.

The draw for the first round of the qualifiers was held on 30 May 2018, 16:00 MYT (UTC+8), at the AFC House in Kuala Lumpur, Malaysia. For the first round, the 27 teams were drawn into six groups: three groups of five teams and three groups of four teams. The teams were seeded according to their performance in the 2017 AFC U-19 Women's Championship final tournament and qualification. The following restrictions were also applied:
The four teams which indicated their intention to serve as qualification group hosts prior to the draw were drawn into separate groups.

Notes
Teams in bold automatically qualified for the final tournament.
Teams in italics advanced to second round.
(H): Qualification first round group hosts (* Lebanon and Vietnam chosen as group hosts after the draw)
(Q): Automatically qualified for final tournament as host regardless of first round qualification results, and did not advance to second round
(W): Withdrew after draw

Did not enter

Re-draw
Due to the withdrawal of Afghanistan and Northern Mariana Islands after the draw, there were only three teams left in Group E, but still five teams in Groups B and C. As a result, AFC decided to hold a re-draw for the qualification first round to maintain the balance of number of teams across all groups (one group of five teams and five groups of four teams). The re-draw was held at the AFC House on 30 August 2018. In the re-draw, unranked teams from Group B (Pakistan, Nepal, Singapore) and Group C (United Arab Emirates, Guam, Maldives) were placed in a pot and the first ball drawn would be moved to Group E. Singapore was drawn and as a result moved from Group B to Group E.

Player eligibility
Players born between 1 January 2000 and 31 December 2004 are eligible to compete in the tournament.

Format
In each group, teams play each other once at a centralised venue.
In the first round, the six group winners and the two best runners-up advance to the second round. However, the final tournament hosts Thailand do not advance to the second round. If they win their group, the runner-up of their group advances to the second round, or if they are among the two best runners-up, the third best runner-up advances to the second round.
In the second round, the two group winners and the two group runners-up qualify for the final tournament to join the four automatically qualified teams.

Tiebreakers
Teams are ranked according to points (3 points for a win, 1 point for a draw, 0 points for a loss), and if tied on points, the following tiebreaking criteria are applied, in the order given, to determine the rankings (Regulations Article 9.3):
Points in head-to-head matches among tied teams;
Goal difference in head-to-head matches among tied teams;
Goals scored in head-to-head matches among tied teams;
If more than two teams are tied, and after applying all head-to-head criteria above, a subset of teams are still tied, all head-to-head criteria above are reapplied exclusively to this subset of teams;
Goal difference in all group matches;
Goals scored in all group matches;
Penalty shoot-out if only two teams are tied and they met in the last round of the group;
Disciplinary points (yellow card = 1 point, red card as a result of two yellow cards = 3 points, direct red card = 3 points, yellow card followed by direct red card = 4 points);
Drawing of lots.

First round
The first round was played between 20 and 28 October 2018.

Group A
All matches were held in Lebanon.
Times listed are UTC+3 on 24 and 26 October, UTC+2 on 28 October 2018.

Group B
All matches were held in Thailand.
Times listed are UTC+7.

Group C
All matches were held in Kyrgyzstan.
Times listed are UTC+6.

Group D
All matches were held in Tajikistan.
Times listed are UTC+5.

Group E
All matches were held in Vietnam.
Times listed are UTC+7.

Group F
All matches were held in Myanmar.
Times listed are UTC+6:30.

Ranking of second-placed teams
Due to groups having different number of teams after withdrawals, the results against the fourth-placed and fifth-placed teams in four-team and five-team groups are not considered for this ranking.

Second round
The draw for the second round of the qualifiers was held on 13 February 2019, 15:00 MYT (UTC+8), at the AFC House in Kuala Lumpur, Malaysia. For the second round, the eight teams were drawn into two groups of four teams. The teams were seeded according to their performance in the 2017 AFC U-19 Women's Championship final tournament and qualification. The following restrictions were also applied:
The two teams which indicated their intention to serve as qualification group hosts prior to the draw were drawn into separate groups.

Notes
Teams in bold qualified for the final tournament.
(H): Qualification second round group hosts

The second round was played between 26 and 30 April 2019.

Group A
All matches were held in Myanmar.
Times listed are UTC+6:30.

Group B
All matches were held in Vietnam.
Times listed are UTC+7.

Qualified teams
The following eight teams qualified for the final tournament.

1 Bold indicates champions for that year. Italic indicates hosts for that year.

Goalscorers
First round: 
Second round: 
In total,

References

External links
, the-AFC.com
AFC U-19 Women's Championship 2019, stats.the-AFC.com

Qualification
2019
U-19 Women's Championship qualification
U-19 Women's Championship qualification
2018 in women's association football
2019 in women's association football
2018 in youth association football
2019 in youth association football
October 2018 sports events in Asia
April 2019 sports events in Asia